The Guyana women's national basketball team represents Guyana in international competitions. It is governed by the Guyana Amateur Basketball Federation (GABF).

See also
 Basketball in Guyana

References

External links
 Latinbasket.com - Guyana Women National Team 
 GuyanaBasketball.com
 Presentation at CaribbeanBasketball.com
 Archived records of Guyana team participations

Women's national basketball teams in South America
Basketball in Guyana
Basketball teams in Guyana
Basketball